Oumar Barry (born July 18, 1986) is a Guinean-born Qatari footballer who is a goalkeeper.

External links
 QSL.com.qa profile
 Goalzz.com profile

1986 births
Living people
Al-Rayyan SC players
Association football goalkeepers
Qatari footballers
Qatar international footballers
Qatari people of Guinean descent
Guinean footballers
El Jaish SC players
Qatar Stars League players
Qatari Second Division players
Naturalised citizens of Qatar